Bralen Trice is an American football defensive end for the Washington Huskies.

High school career
Trice attended Sandra Day O'Connor High School in Phoenix, Arizona. During his high school career he had 16.5 sacks. He committed to the University of Washington to play college football.

College career
Trice redshirted his first year at Washington in 2019 and opted out of the 2020 season due to the Covid-19 pandemic. He returned in 2021 to play in all 12 games and made two starts. He finished the year with 14 tackles, two sacks and a fumble he returned for a touchdown. Trice returned to Washington as a starter in 2022.

References

External links
Washington Huskies bio

Living people
Players of American football from Phoenix, Arizona
American football defensive ends
American football linebackers
Washington Huskies football players
Year of birth missing (living people)